A convex cap, also known as a convex floating body or just floating body, is a well defined structure in mathematics commonly used in convex analysis for approximating convex shapes. In general it can be thought of as the intersection of a convex Polytope with a half-space.

Definition 

A cap,  can be defined as the intersection of a half-space  with a convex set . Note that the cap can be defined in any dimensional space.

The definition of a cap can also be extended to define a cap of a point  where the cap  can be defined as the intersection of a convex set  with a half-space  containing .

Floating Bodies and Caps 
We can define the floating body of a convex shape  using the following process. Note the floating body is also convex. In the case of a 2-dimensional convex compact shape , given some  where  is small. The floating body of this 2-dimensional shape is given by removing all the 2 dimensional caps of area  from the original body. The resulting shape will be our convex floating body . We generalize this definition to n dimensions by starting with an n dimensional convex shape and removing caps in the corresponding dimension.

Relation to affine surface area 

As , the floating body more closely approximates . If we take the convex floating body of a shape, we notice that the distance from the boundary of the floating body to the boundary of the convex shape is related to the convex shape's curvature. 
Specifically, convex shapes with higher curvature have a higher distance between the two boundaries. Using the relation between curvature and distance, we can deduce that  is also dependent on the curvature. Thus,

.

We can generalize distance, area and volume for n dimensions using the Hausdorff measure. This definition, then works for all . So, the affine surface area for an n-dimensional convex shape is

where  is the -dimensional Hausdorff measure.

Wet part of a convex body 

So, we can say that  is  equivariant under these types of transformations. Using this notation, . Note that

is also equivariant under  non-degenerate linear transformations.

Caps for approximation
Then,  is a random polytope. We can determine how well  approximates  in various measures of approximation, but we mainly focus on the volume. So, we define , when  refers to the expected value.

Theorem 
The proof of this theorem is based on the technique of  M-regions and cap coverings. We can use the minimal cap which is a cap  containing  and satisfying . Although the minimal cap is not unique, this doesn't have an effect on the proof of the theorem.

Lemma 

Since , this lemma establishes the equivalence of the M-regions  and a minimal cap : a blown up copy of  contains  and a blown up copy of  contains . Thus, M-regions and minimal caps can be interchanged freely, without losing more than a constant factor in estimates.

Economic cap covering 
A cap covering can be defined as the set of caps that completely cover some boundary . By minimizing the size of each cap, we can minimize the size of the set of caps and create a new set. This set of caps with minimal volume is called an economic cap covering and can be explicitly defined as the set of caps  covering some boundary  where each  has some minimal width  and the total volume of this covering is ≪  ⋅ .

References 

Metric geometry
Convex analysis
Computational geometry